Aingzauk is a village in the Ayeyarwady Region of north-west Myanmar. It lies in Yegyi Township.

See also
List of cities, towns and villages in Burma: A

References

Populated places in Ayeyarwady Region